The Ministry of Health of the People's Republic of China (MOH) was a cabinet-level executive department which plays the role of providing information, raising health awareness and education, ensuring the accessibility of health services, and monitoring the quality of health services provided to citizens and visitors in the mainland of the People's Republic of China. In the reforms of 2013 the ministry has been dissolved and its functions integrated into the new agency called the National Health and Family Planning Commission.

The MOH was also involved in the control of illness and disease, coordinating the utilisation of resources and expertise where necessary. It also cooperates and keeps in touch with other health ministries and departments, including those of the special administrative regions, and the World Health Organization (WHO).

As part of the National Health and Family Planning Commission it is now headed by Ms. Li Bin. Until 2013 it was headed by the Minister for Health, a position last held by Chen Zhu who was then the only minister in the State Council, and one of the two ministers who are not members of the Chinese Communist Party. He is the chairman of the Central Committee of the Chinese Peasants' and Workers' Democratic Party, one of the eight legally permissible political parties of the PRC.

Functions and responsibilities
The MOH reports directly to the State Council. Its functions include:

Drafting laws, regulations, plans and policies related to public health
Formulating policies for maternity and child-care programs
Overseeing disease prevention and treatment
Controlling the spread of epidemics
Supervising blood collection
Reforming medical institutions
Overseeing state hospitals
Drawing up medical science and technology development projects
Setting quality standards for foods and cosmetics
Overseeing medical education and setting related standards
Controlling the Beijing Medical College and the Chinese Academy of Medical Sciences; and
Overseeing the State Administration of Traditional Chinese Medicine

List of Health Ministers

See also
State Council of the People's Republic of China
Ministries of China

References

External links 
Ministry of Health
The State Council
Ministry of Health 
"Critical health literacy: a case study from China in schistosomiasis control"
"Children's Health and Care" in China.
"Relationship with China's Ministry of Health and the Chinese Nursing Association" in the University of Michigan.

 
China
Health
Ministries established in 1949
1949 establishments in China
2013 disestablishments in China
Organizations based in Beijing